Ulrika Babiaková (3 April 1976 – 3 November 2002) was a Slovak astronomer and discoverer of minor planets from Banská Štiavnica, Slovakia. She is credited by the Minor Planet Center with the discovery and co-discovery of 14 asteroids during 1998–2001.

Babiaková died at the age of 26 in an accident.

The main-belt asteroid 32531 Ulrikababiaková, discovered by astronomer and husband Peter Kušnirák in 2001, was named in her memory on 8 October 2014.

References 
 

1976 births
2002 deaths
20th-century astronomers
21st-century astronomers
Discoverers of asteroids

People from Banská Štiavnica
Slovak astronomers
Women astronomers